Adelaide Frances Tambo  (née Tshukudu; 18 July 1929 – 31 January 2007) was a South African anti-apartheid activist and former political exile.

She was involved in South African politics for five decades and was married to Oliver Tambo, president of the African National Congress (ANC), from 1967 to 1991. She was well-known for her role in the struggle against anti-apartheid.

Early career
Born on 18 July 1929 in Top Location as Adelaide Frances Tshukudu, she was affectionately known as Mama Tambo in South Africa. At the age of 10, following a raid by the police on a riot in Top Location a police officer was killed, and Adelaide's ailing grandfather, aged 82, was among those arrested and taken to the town square. Her grandfather collapsed and she had to sit with him until he regained consciousness. After the incident, she vowed to fight the police till the end. She attended the St Thomas Practising School in Johannesburg and Orlando High in Soweto.

Tambo started working as a nurse at the Chris Hani Baragwanath Hospital. In 1944, she worked as a courier for the ANC. She joined the ANC Youth League at 18, which she was tasked to open branches in Transvaal and elected chairperson of the George Goch branch. She left the country along with her husband, Oliver Tambo in 1960 and worked as a courier for her husband. She was also one of the founding members of Afro-Asian Solidarity Movement and Pan African Women's Organization (PAWO) in 1963.

Political career
Following the end of apartheid, Tambo served as a member of parliament from 1994 to 1999.

Tambo received the Order of the Baobab in Gold, one of the highest honours bestowed by the post-1994 South African government. The South African Anglican Church awarded her the Order of Simon of Cyrene, the highest award given to laypeople for distinguished service.

Personal life and death
Tambo was married to Oliver Tambo in December 1956 during the Treason Trial and the couple had three children; one of whom, their son, Dali, is a television talk-show personality.

Tambo died on 31 January 2007, aged 77 at her home in Johannesburg, from undisclosed causes. She was buried next to her husband in her home town of Wattville on 10 February 2007. The service was held in a stadium and led by Anglican Archbishop Njongonkulu Ndungane. Among the thousands of mourners were presidents Thabo Mbeki and Nelson Mandela.

References

External links
Obituary, The Independent, 2 February 2007
Obituary, The Times, 2 February 2007
 Obituary, The Guardian, 2 February 2007

Further reading
Short biography of Adelaide Tambo  on SAhistory.org.za.
 PBS interview with Adelaide Tambo about Nelson Mandela.
Adelaide Tambo's political profile on the website of the ANC.

1929 births
2007 deaths
People from Johannesburg
South African Anglicans
Alumni of Keele University
African National Congress politicians
Members of the National Assembly of South Africa
Order of the Baobab
20th-century South African women politicians
20th-century South African politicians
Women members of the National Assembly of South Africa